Gumrah may refer to:
Gumrah (1963 film)
Gumrah (1993 film)
Gumrah: End of Innocence, an Indian crime television series that began airing in March 2012
Gumrah (TV series), a Pakistani romantic television series that began airing in September 2017